The Alamo: 13 Days to Glory is a 1987 American Western television miniseries later edited into a feature film about the 1836 Battle of the Alamo written and directed by Burt Kennedy, starring James Arness as James Bowie, Brian Keith as Davy Crockett, Alec Baldwin as William Barrett Travis, Raul Julia as Antonio López de Santa Anna, and featuring a single scene cameo by Lorne Greene as Sam Houston. Unlike most other films about the Alamo — the most prominent other exception being the 1955 film The Last Command (which was released during the cultural frenzy created by Walt Disney's Davy Crockett television miniseries) — it focuses on Bowie as the main character rather than Crockett.

The production was shot at Alamo Village, the Alamo replica built by John Wayne for his lavish 1960 film The Alamo.

Much of the footage of the final battle scene was recycled from earlier films.

Premise
Against orders and no hope of relief Texas patriots led by Bill Travis (Alec Baldwin), Jim Bowie (James Arness) and Davy Crockett (Brian Keith) defend the Alamo against the overwhelming Mexican forces led by the merciless General Antonio Lopez de Santa Anna (Raul Julia).

Cast
 James Arness as Jim Bowie
 Brian Keith as Davy Crockett
 Alec Baldwin as Bill Travis
 Raul Julia as General Antonio López de Santa Anna
 David Ogden Stiers as Colonel Black
 Jon Lindstrom as Captain Almaron Dickinson
 Lorne Greene as Sam Houston (in his final film role)
 Jim Metzler as Major James Bonham
 Tom Schanley as Private Danny Cloud
 Fernando Allende as Colonel Alamonte, Santa Anna's Nephew
 Kathleen York as Susannah Dickinson
 Isela Vega as Senora Cos
 Gene Evans as McGregor
 Michael Wren as Juan Seguin
 Hinton Battle as Joe, Travis' Servant
 David Sheiner as Luis
 Noble Willingham as Dr. Pollard
 Eloy Casados as Gregorio
 Tony Becker as George Taylor
 Thomas Callaway as Colonel James W. Fannin
 Buck Taylor as "Colorado" Smith
 Jerry Potter as Jacob Walker
 Grainger Hines as Charles Despelier
 Tom Everett as Major Evans
 Stan Ivar as "Doc" Sutherland
 Ethan Wayne as Edward Taylor
 Jan Tríska as General Wolf
 Gary Kasper as Major Wheelwright
 John Furlong as Zanco
 Jay Baker as Hayes
 Dale Swann as Lieutenant Kimball
 Laura Fabian as Lucia
 Loyda Ramos as Senora Esparza
 Bel Sandre
 Laura Martinez Harring as Santa Anna's Bride
 Nicky Blair as John Jones
 Red West as Cockran (uncredited)

References

External links
 

1987 television films
Cultural depictions of Davy Crockett
1987 Western (genre) films
Films directed by Burt Kennedy
Films set in 1836
Films shot in Texas
NBC network original films
Siege films
Texas Revolution films
American Western (genre) television films
1980s English-language films
Cultural depictions of James Bowie